Ihor Oleksandrovych Tymoshenko (Ukrainian: Ігор Олександрович Тимошенко; born in 22 March 1965) is a Ukrainian politician and activist, who had served as the acting governor of Rivne Oblast in 2019.

Biography

From April 2004 to February 2005, he was the head of the Dubrovnik regional state administration.

On 24 June 2019, Tymshenko became the acting Governor of Rivne Oblast. On 9 September, he was replaced by his successor, Vitaliy Koval.

References

1965 births
Living people
Governors of Rivne Oblast